Saint Parascheva Church is a Romanian Orthodox church in Poienile Izei Commune, Maramureș County, Romania. Built in 1700, it is one of eight buildings that make up the wooden churches of Maramureș UNESCO World Heritage Site, and is also listed as a historic monument by the country's Ministry of Culture and Religious Affairs.

References

Poienile Izei
Churches completed in 1700
17th-century Eastern Orthodox church buildings
Poienile Izei
Romanian Orthodox churches in Romania
1700 establishments in the Habsburg monarchy
17th-century establishments in Hungary